Teagasc (meaning "Instruction") is the semi-state authority in the Republic of Ireland responsible for research and development, training and advisory services in the agri-food sector.

The official title of the body is Teagasc - The Agriculture and Food Development Authority. In 1988 Teagasc succeeded An Foras Talúntais/The Agricultural Institute (AFT) which was responsible for agricultural research, and An Chomhairle Oiliúna Talmhaíochta/The Agricultural Training Council (ACOT) which was responsible for education and advisory services.

Teagasc Colleges and Research Centres
The authority has a number of county advisory centres, colleges and research centres in which it carries out its main business. The Teagasc headquarters are located in the Oak Park Estate in Carlow.

Teagasc Agricultural/Horticultural Colleges 
 Clonakilty Agricultural College
Kildalton Agricultural and Horticultural College
Ballyhaise Agricultural College
College of Amenity Horticulture located at the Botanic Gardens, Glasnevin, Dublin.
Teagasc eCollege

Private Agricultural/Horticultural Colleges 
Gurteen Agricultural College
Mountbellew Agricultural College 
Warrenstown Horticultural College (closed in 2009)
Pallaskenry Agricultural College

Food Research Centres 
Moorepark Food Research Centre, Fermoy, Co Cork. (functional foods, dairy, food ingredients and formulated foods and beverages) 
Ashtown Food Research Centre (food product innovation, quality and safety, meat science, bioactives, nutraceuticals, bakery technology, seafood innovation, Horticulture including plant diagnostics and Forestry).

Agricultural Research Centres
Animal Bioscience Research Centre (efficiency of production of high-quality meat and milk)
Athenry Production Research Centre (sheep Production, animal Reproduction, organic milk, beef and sheep production) 
Grange Research Centre (beef)
Johnstown Research Centre (soil, environment and organic farming) 
Kinsealy Research Centre (formerly horticulture; since closed, with facilities relocated to Ashtown, Dublin 15, in 2012)
Moorepark Research Centre (dairy and pigs)
Oak Park Research Centre (arable crop)
 Rural Economy Research Centre (social science research and policy)

References

External links
Official site
Mountbellew Agricultural College
T-Stór - Teagasc’s Open Access Repository

Agriculture in the Republic of Ireland
Agricultural organisations based in Ireland
Food and Agriculture Organization